Katie Silverman (born February 8, 2005) is an American actress best known for portraying the young Jacqueline Bouvier in Michael Wilson's production of Grey Gardens at the Ahmanson Theatre in Los Angeles, California. She also has been recurring as Young Jess on Fox's New Girl Young Penny on ABC's Happy Endings and Stevie on Hulu's PEN15.

Filmography

Film

Television

Awards and nominations

References

External links

2005 births
Living people
Actresses from Los Angeles
21st-century American women